There are four Turkey border walls:
 Turkey–Syria border barrier
 Turkey–Iran border barrier
 Bulgaria–Turkey border
 Turkey–Greece border barrier